Mie Takeda (born 13 November 1976) is a Japanese biathlete. She competed in the two events at the 1998 Winter Olympics.

References

1976 births
Living people
Biathletes at the 1998 Winter Olympics
Japanese female biathletes
Olympic biathletes of Japan
Place of birth missing (living people)